This article lists all rugby league footballers who have played first-grade for the St. George Illawarra Dragons in the National Rugby League. The St. George Illawarra Dragons are a rugby league club who compete in Australasia's National Rugby League. They share home games between Jubilee Oval and Wollongong Showground.

List of players
NOTES:

 Debut:
 Players are listed in the order of their debut game with the club.
 Players that debuted in the same game are added alphabetically.
 Appearances: St. George Illawarra Dragons games only, not a total of their career games. E.g. Nathan Fien has played a career total of 276 first-grade games but of those, 80 were at St. George Illawarra.
 Previous Club: refers to the previous first-grade rugby league club (NRL or Super League) the player played at and does not refer to any junior club, Rugby Union club or a rugby league club he was signed to but never played at.
 The statistics in this table are correct as of round 2 of the 2023 NRL season.

Women's
Updated to Round 3 of the 2021 NRL Women's season

External links
Official St George Illawarra player numbers
Rugby League Tables / St. George Illawarra Point Scorers
RLP List of Players
RLP St. George Illawarra Dragons Transfers & Debuts

 
Players
Lists of Australian rugby league players
National Rugby League lists
Sydney-sport-related lists
Wollongong-related lists